The Roman Catholic Diocese of Koper is a diocese in southwestern Slovenia. It is part of the Ecclesiastical province of Ljubljana. Its cathedral is dedicated to the Assumption of Mary and is located in the Adriatic port town of Koper. A co-cathedral, the Co-Cathedral of Christ the Saviour, located in Nova Gorica, gained its status in 2004. The Latin name of the diocese, Dioecesis Iustinopolitana, is due to the fact that Koper was in the past name Justinopolis in honour of the Byzantine emperor Justinian II.

History
 October 17, 1977: Established as Diocese of Koper from the Diocese of Trieste–Koper, Italy

Special churches

Cathedrals
Cathedral of the Assumption of the Blessed Virgin Mary, Koper
Co-Cathedral of Christ the Saviour, Nova Gorica
Minor Basilicas
Romarska cerkev (bazilika) Marijinega vnebovzetja, Solkan (Sveta Gora)

Leadership
Bishops of Koper (Roman rite)
1 Janez Jenko (17 October 1977 – 15 April 1987)
 Metod Pirih, coadjutor bishop (25 March 1985 – 16 April 1987)
2 Metod Pirih (16 April 1987 – 26 May 2012)
 Jurij Bizjak, auxiliary, titular bishop of Gergis (13 May 2000 – 26 May 2012)
3 Jurij Bizjak (since 26 May 2012)

See also
Roman Catholicism in Slovenia

External links
 
 Official site
 GCatholic.org
 Catholic Hierarchy

Koper
Koper
Koper
Diocese
1977 establishments in Yugoslavia